Phaeoxantha bucephala is a species of tiger beetle in the subfamily Cicindelinae, described by W. Horn in 1909.

References

Beetles described in 1909
Beetles of South America